Simone Berbain (1915-1949) was a French historian and archivist.

Born in Paris January 31, 1915, Berbain spent her childhood in Indochina.

She attended École Nationale des Chartes where she trained as an archiviste paléographe. In 1939 Berbain completed her thesis on a French trading post in West Africa in the 18th century. Published in 1942 as "Le comptoir français de Juda (Ouidah) au XVIIIe siècle," the work was a well-received contribution to the history of the role France in the Atlantic slave trade.

Berbain's interest in questions of social history and the human elements that drove economic systems led to her involvement in various organizations during and immediately after the war. This included the Centre d'information interprofessionnelle, Cabinet du ministre de la Production industrielle, and the Comité interministériel pour les questions de coopération économique européenne.

Berbain married a classmate, Jacques Bénet, in 1944. Bénet was heavily involved in the French Resistance, and later was involved in advocating for POWs, deportees and refugees in France, during and after the Second World War. The couple had two children.

Simone died in Paris on November 21, 1949. Bénet's brother-in-law (it is unclear if this is Berbain's brother), then living in Algeria, took care of Simone's children, although her eldest daughter Christine, died in early 1950.

Select bibliography 

 Relations économiques de la France avec la Guinée de 1664 à 1797. (1939)
 Comptoir français de Juda (Ouidah), au XVIIIe siècle. (1942)
 Etudes sur la traite des noirs au Golf de Guinée. (1942)
 Les comités d'organisation: un bilan : octobre 1944. (1945)

References

1915 births
1949 deaths
French people of colonial Vietnam
École Nationale des Chartes alumni
French women historians
Scientists from Paris
20th-century French women